About Sara Hooker Capron

Capron Hall Higher Secondary School is a school in Madurai in the Indian state of Tamil Nadu. It is part of the Madurai-Ramnad Diocese of the Church of South India.

It is located in Puttuthoppu road, Mangalapuram Aarappalayam. This school has both Tamil as well as English medium.

The Capron Hall School was known as the first ever school which is built in Madurai city. The work was started about early 1800s and was completed around 1835. The school was named after the American missionary called Sarah Hooker Capron who was known as the founder of the school. Later, the school was taken over by the Diocese of Madurai and Ramnad. In early days, it served the people by giving education to the Madurai people, later it turned focus on women's education. It has been 182 years since it started by Sara Hooker Capron to serve the people. The school is currently functioning with excellence under guidance of the Eminent Correspondent Mr. Marthandan Thomas, Rtd Head Master AC Hr Sec School, Madurai and The Patriotic Head Mistress Mrs.Sathiyavathi Kala Rani, M.Sc., M.Phil., M.Ed.

References

Church of South India schools
Christian schools in Tamil Nadu
High schools and secondary schools in Tamil Nadu
Schools in Madurai